Nageia motleyi is a species of conifer in the family Podocarpaceae. It is found in Brunei, Indonesia, Malaysia, and Thailand.

References

Podocarpaceae
Least concern plants
Taxonomy articles created by Polbot
Flora of the Borneo lowland rain forests